The 2018 Vuelta a España was the 73rd edition of the race. It was the last of cycling's three Grand Tours to take place during the 2018 road cycling season. The race started in Málaga on 25 August and finished in Madrid on 16 September. All 18 UCI World Tour teams were automatically entitled to start the race.

Teams

Cyclists

By starting number

By team

By nationality 
The 176 riders that are competing in the 2018 Vuelta a España originated from 30 different countries.

References

2018 Vuelta a España
2018